Red River Valley is a 1997 film directed by Feng Xiaoning about the British expedition to Tibet, starring Paul Kersey and Ning Jing. It was also released under the title A Tale of the Sacred Mountain. A book by Peter Fleming, Ian Fleming's brother, is credited in the movie. In 1961, Fleming published Bayonets to Lhasa: The First Full Account of the British Invasion of Tibet in 1904.

The film won numerous prizes at China's three main award ceremonies: Huabiao, Golden Rooster and Hundred Flowers.

The film's production was part of an official Chinese government effort - also reflected in the national curriculum - to incorporate the expedition to Tibet into the story of the century of humiliation narrative that China suffered at the hands of Western and Japanese invaders and commercial interests.

References

External links

1997 films
Chinese historical drama films
1990s Mandarin-language films
1990s English-language films
History of China on film
Films about Tibet
Shanghai Film Studio films
Tibetan-language films
Films directed by Feng Xiaoning